A  bronze statue of decorated World War II soldier Joe P. Martínez is installed outside the Colorado State Capitol, in Denver.

References

External links

 

Bronze sculptures in Colorado
Monuments and memorials in Colorado
Outdoor sculptures in Denver
Sculptures of men in Colorado
Statues in Colorado